Dainis Ozols (born 11 September 1966) is a former professional cyclist from Latvia. In the 1992 Summer Olympics he won a bronze medal in the 194 km road race, finishing in 4:32:24, 3 seconds behind Erik Dekker of the Netherlands and 4 seconds behind the winner Fabio Casartelli of Italy. He competed in one Grand Tour in his career: the 1995 Vuelta a España, where he finished 50th overall.

His surname is often misspelled as Ozolos and he is often incorrectly identified as having Polish or Lithuanian Nationality. Early in his amateur career, he did race as a national of the USSR.

Major results

1988
 3rd Overall Okolo Slovenska
1st Stages 5 & 7
1989
 1st Overall Rás Tailteann
1st Stages 4 & 9 (ITT)
 1st Stage 5 Giro delle Regioni
 1st Stages 3 & 4 Girobio
1992
 1st Overall Regio-Tour
1st Stage 1
 3rd  Road race, Summer Olympics
1993
 3rd Overall GP Tell
1st Stage 2
 2nd Overall Circuit Franco-Belge
1st Stage 4
1994
 1st Overall Circuit Franco-Belge
1st Stages 5 (ITT) & 7
 1st Stage 3 Grand Prix François Faber
 8th Overall Tour DuPont
1995
 8th Tour de Berne
1996
 4th Overall Peace Race
1st Stage 7
1997
 National Road Championships
1st  Time trial
4th Road race
 1st Overall Rheinland-Pfalz Rundfahrt
1st Stage 9
 1st Overall Tour of Małopolska
 6th Overall Tour de Pologne
 8th Overall Tour du Poitou Charentes
 10th Overall Tour of Sweden
1998
 1st  Time trial, National Road Championships
1999
 1st  Time trial, National Road Championships
 3rd Overall Saaremaa Velotuur
1st Stage 6 (ITT)
2000
 1st Stage 9 Peace Race
 2nd National Time Trial Championships
 6th Overall Tour of Austria

References

External links
 

1966 births
Living people
Cyclists at the 1992 Summer Olympics
Cyclists at the 1996 Summer Olympics
Cyclists at the 2000 Summer Olympics
Latvian male cyclists
Olympic bronze medalists for Latvia
Olympic cyclists of Latvia
Olympic medalists in cycling
People from Smiltene
Medalists at the 1992 Summer Olympics
Rás Tailteann winners